Khuan Niang is a district (amphoe) of Songkhla province, southern Thailand.

History
The minor district (king amphoe) was established on 2 January 1985 by splitting off four tambons from Rattaphum district. It was upgraded to a full district on 21 May 1990.

Geography
Neighboring districts are (from the east clockwise): Singhanakhon, Bang Klam, and Rattaphum of Songkhla Province and Pak Phayun of Phatthalung province.

Administration
The district is divided into four sub-districts (tambons), which are further subdivided into 46 villages (mubans). Khuan Niang is a township (thesaban tambon) which covers parts of the tambon Rattaphum. There are a further four tambon administrative organizations (TAO).

References

External links
amphoe.com

Districts of Songkhla province